Omorgus elongatus is a species of hide beetle in the subfamily Omorginae.

References

elongatus
Beetles described in 1954